Phaenosperma is a genus of Asian plants in the grass family. The only known species is Phaenosperma globosum, native to China (Anhui, Gansu, Guangxi, Hubei, Jiangsu, Jiangxi, Shaanxi, Sichuan, Taiwan, Tibet, Yunnan, Zhejiang), Japan, Korea, Assam, and Bhutan.

References

Pooideae
Monotypic Poaceae genera
Flora of Asia